Nadja Kamer (born 23 July 1986) is a World Cup alpine ski racer from Switzerland. From Schwyz, Kamer specializes in the speed events of Downhill and Super G and has made five World Cup podiums, all in downhill.

World Cup results

Season standings

Race podiums
 5 podiums – (5 DH)

World Championship results

Olympic results

References

External links
 
 Nadja Kamer World Cup standings at the International Ski Federation
 
 
 nadjakamer.ch – personal site – 
 Swiss Ski team – official site – 
Voelkl.com – team – racing – Nadja Kamer

Swiss female alpine skiers
Living people
1986 births
Alpine skiers at the 2010 Winter Olympics
Olympic alpine skiers of Switzerland
Sportspeople from the canton of Schwyz
21st-century Swiss women